Vendone is a comune (municipality) in the Province of Savona in the Italian region Liguria, located about  southwest of Genoa and about  southwest of Savona.

Vendone borders the following municipalities: Arnasco, Castelbianco, Onzo, and Ortovero.

Ralated articles 
 Monte Peso Grande

References

Cities and towns in Liguria